Linda Shaye is an American film, television, and theater actress. In a career spanning over forty years, she has appeared in more than a hundred feature films. She is perhaps best known for her starring role as Elise Rainier in the Insidious film series (2010–2018), and as Magda in There's Something About Mary.

Shaye is regarded as a scream queen due to her roles in various horror films, including Alone in the Dark (1982), A Nightmare on Elm Street (1984), Critters (1986) and its sequel Critters 2: The Main Course (1988), Amityville: A New Generation (1993), Wes Craven's New Nightmare (1994), Dead End (2003), 2001 Maniacs (2005) and its sequel 2001 Maniacs: Field of Screams (2010), Ouija (2014) and its prequel Ouija: Origin of Evil (2016), Tales of Halloween (2015), Abattoir (2016), The Final Wish (2018), Room for Rent (2019), The Grudge (2020), and the Insidious   universe.

Shaye is also well known for her comedic roles in numerous films by the Farrelly brothers, including Dumb and Dumber (1994), Kingpin (1996), There's Something About Mary (1998), Detroit Rock City (1999), Me, Myself & Irene (2000), Stuck on You (2003), and The Three Stooges (2012).

Early life
Shaye was born in Detroit, Michigan, the daughter of Dorothy (née Katz), a homemaker, and Max Mendle Shaye, a painter and supermarket owner affiliated with the Grosse Point Quality Food Co. in Detroit. Her brother is film executive Robert Shaye. Her family is Jewish; her mother was born in Russia, and her paternal grandparents were from Romania, and settled in Michigan.

Shaye studied acting at the University of Michigan before she moved to New York to appear in Off Broadway productions. In 1977, she moved to Los Angeles to pursue her acting career.

Career
In 1975, Shaye made her film debut with a small role in Hester Street, followed by small roles in several movies and television shows. In 1978, she appeared in the Jack Nicholson-directed Western Goin' South. "I got a call saying, 'Mr. Nicholson wants you in Mexico for two weeks for this small role called The Parasol Lady'. It was so much fun." She has since appeared in a large number of character roles.

From 1980 to 1996, she has appeared in four films by director Walter Hill: The Long Riders, Brewster's Millions, Extreme Prejudice and Last Man Standing. In 1984, Shaye played a teacher in A Nightmare on Elm Street. The film was distributed by New Line Cinema, the company founded by the actress' older brother Robert Shaye. She has admitted the family connection helped her a little. "My brother said, 'Put my sister in your movie!'"

In 1994, she had her breakout comedy role of Mrs. Neugeboren in the Farrelly Brothers' Dumb and Dumber. The film was released on December 16, 1994. Despite receiving mixed reviews from critics, it was a commercial success and developed a cult following in the years since its release. The Farrellys then subsequently cast her as Woody Harrelson's gruesome landlady in Kingpin. Next they gave her a role as Cameron Diaz's character's overtanned neighbor Magda in the 1998 hit There's Something About Mary. The Farrellys said, 'We want her to look like an old leather bag,' " recalled Shaye. "It was four hours every time they put on the makeup." The film was a sleeper hit, and was the highest-grossing comedy of 1998 in North America as well as the fourth-highest-grossing film of the year. For her performance, Shaye was nominated for a Blockbuster Entertainment Award for Favorite Supporting Actress – Comedy. She followed this with 1999's Detroit Rock City as an uptight mother waging a personal war against the band Kiss.

In 2003, Shaye appeared alongside Cuba Gooding Jr. and Horatio Sanz in Boat Trip as Sonya, a horny tanning coach who becomes obsessed with Sanz's character. That same year she co-starred with Ray Wise and Alexandra Holden in the cult horror film Dead End as Laura Harrington, and as Jenny Buono, the mother of 1970s Los Angeles serial killer Angelo Buono in The Hillside Strangler. For her role in Dead End, Shaye received positive reviews and was nominated for a Fangoria Chainsaw Award for Best Supporting Actress.

In 2005, Shaye appeared in the film 2001 Maniacs as Granny Boone and again in the sequel 2001 Maniacs: Field of Screams. The next year she had a supporting role in the thriller Snakes on a Plane, playing Grace, the senior flight attendant who acts as the flight's purser. In 2007, she appeared in the short films Sponsored By, Under The Gun, Midnight Snack, Time Upon a Once, Old Home Boyz, Backseat Driving Test, and The Yes Men  which were directed by contestants on the reality show On the Lot.

In 2011, Shaye played medium Elise, a supporting role, in the horror film Insidious. "It scared the daylights out of me," said Shaye. "I read it in bed, and when I finished, I took it downstairs and locked it in the closet. I really was chilled to the bone by the story." The film was released on April 1, 2011, and received positive reviews. It grossed a total of $97,009,150 worldwide. It was the most profitable film of 2011. Shaye received positive reviews and was nominated for a Fangoria Chainsaw Award for Best Supporting Actress, a Fright Meter Award for Best Supporting Actress, and a Saturn Award for Best Supporting Actress.

On November 19, 2012, it was officially announced that Shaye, Patrick Wilson, and Rose Byrne would reprise their roles from the first film. The film was released September 13, 2013. It received mixed reviews and was a box office success.

Shaye returned as Elise, this time in the leading role, in the third and fourth installments of the Insidious franchise, Insidious: Chapter 3 and Insidious: The Last Key. Speaking of the role in the third film, Shaye said "Elise has become this sort of bad ass in this installment, I can't even tell you how much fun that was for me. I'm not taking names!" Insidious: Chapter 3 received a mixed response from critics, and Shaye's performance was well-received by critics and audiences. Rotten Tomatoes lists a 59% approval rating, with the site's critical consensus reading "Insidious: Chapter 3 isn't as terrifying as the original, although it boasts surprising thematic depth and is enlivened by another fine performance from Lin Shaye." A writer from The Wrap opined that Shaye "shines" in the film. The Oakland Post Online said, "Shaye is able to give the film most of its heart. Many of the horror scenes rely on her to be either the calming voice or the badass heroine, and Shaye plays both of those roles perfectly," also adding, "Insidious: Chapter 3 could have been a disaster, but thanks to some genuinely scary moments and veteran acting from Lin Shaye, the film is able to be mostly enjoyable."

In 2020, Shaye received the Daytime Emmy Award for Outstanding Guest Performer in a Digital Drama Series for her guest role on the dark comedy web series EastSiders.
In April, 2020, Shaye gave an exclusive interview to Ukrainian horror writer Denis Bushlatov.  For the time being it is the only interview given to the Russian horror community.

Personal life
Shaye has been married twice. Her first husband, writer and musician Marshall Rubinoff, died in 1968 at age 24. In 1988, she married actor Clayton Landey, with whom she appeared in 2002's Wish You Were Dead. The couple had one child before divorcing in 2003.

Filmography

Film

Television

Video games

Awards and nominations

References

External links

American film actresses
Living people
University of Michigan School of Music, Theatre & Dance alumni
American television actresses
American people of Romanian-Jewish descent
American people of Russian-Jewish descent
20th-century American actresses
21st-century American actresses
Jewish American actresses
Actresses from Detroit
American stage actresses
21st-century American Jews
Year of birth missing (living people)